Mionochroma pseudovittatum is a species of beetle in the family Cerambycidae. It was described by Schwarzer in 1923. It is known from southeastern Brazil.

References

Cerambycinae
Beetles described in 1923